Ayensu River is a river in Ghana. It discharges into Ouiba Lagoon, and is surrounded by the Winneba Wetlands. As early as 1939 there were plans to build a bridge along the river near Jahadzi. Geologically, Ayensuadzi-Brusheng Quartz Schists are found in the river area.

References

Rivers of Ghana